Stânceni is a commune in Mureș County, Transylvania, Romania that is composed of three villages: Ciobotani (Csobotány), Meștera (Mesterháza) and Stânceni. It has a population of 1,547: 82% Romanians,  17% Hungarians and 1% others.

See also
List of Hungarian exonyms (Mureș County)

References

Communes in Mureș County
Localities in Transylvania